Seminole patchwork, referred to by Seminole and Miccosukee women as Taweekaache (design in the Mikasuki language), is a patchwork style made from piecing colorful strips of fabric in horizontal bands. Seminole patchwork garments are often trimmed with a rickrack border. Early examples of this technique are known from photographs in the 1910s, and its use by Seminole women in garment construction began to flourish in the 1920s. Seminole patchwork has historically been an important source of income for many Seminole women, and today remains a source of cultural pride. Fashion designers, including Donna Karan, have been criticized for their appropriation of this patchwork style.

Gallery

References 

Needlework
Textile techniques
Textile arts
Seminole culture